Saint Llibio was a 6th-century saint of North Wales and Patron Saint of Llanllibio.
His church was in ruins by 1776 and has subsequently been demolished. He give his name to the village of Llanllibio. His feast day in Roman Catholic Church is 28 February.

References

External links
Saints.SQPN: Saint Llibio
Catholic Online: Saint Llibio

Welsh Roman Catholic saints
6th-century Christian saints
6th-century births
Year of birth unknown
Year of death unknown
6th-century Welsh people